The Alley Cat is a 1941 American animated short film released by Metro-Goldwyn-Mayer. Directed by Hugh Harman, the film centres on Butch, Toodles Galore, and Spike the Bulldog, who were subsequently integrated as recurring characters into the Tom and Jerry series of shorts (start in Baby Puss (1943)).

Plot
Butch is a black male alley cat who is instantly smitten with Toodles, a white, elegant female cat he sees on the balcony of her wealthy family's penthouse apartment on Park Avenue. He serenades her, but the butler sends the family's bulldog Spike after him.

A long, fast-paced chase ensues, with Spike being outwitted by Butch every time, and the chase ends with the butler accidentally hitting Spike with a broom when the dog chases Butch, causing Spike to turn against the butler out of anger. Once Spike and the butler are out of the way, Butch makes it into the apartment to dance with his new love.

References

External links

1941 animated films
Films directed by Hugh Harman
Metro-Goldwyn-Mayer animated short films
1940s animated short films
1940s American animated films
Metro-Goldwyn-Mayer short films
Films scored by Scott Bradley
1941 films
1941 short films
Films produced by Fred Quimby
Animated films about cats
Films set in Manhattan
Metro-Goldwyn-Mayer cartoon studio short films
Tom and Jerry